Clown Princes is a 1939 Our Gang short comedy film directed by George Sidney. Produced and released by Metro-Goldwyn-Mayer, it was the 178th Our Gang short to be released.

Plot
When the gang goes to Porky's house, they learn that his family is in danger of eviction unless they pay their landlord the balance remaining on their rent. The gang decides to raise the money by setting up a circus in Porky's barn, with Spanky as the ringleader. A sideshow outside introduces the kid circus' young patrons to Oogie-Boogie, the Wildman from Borneo (Buckwheat), Mademoiselle Darla, the Greatest Rattlesnake Charmer in the World, and the World's Shortest and Tallest Men (Slapsie in a beard and Sniffles on stilts). Also included in the sideshow are the Head Without a Body (Porky), and The Famous Sime and Neez Twins - two boys with their clothes stitched together, revealed as such when Violet the Goat eats the grass skirt covering the stitching.

Inside the main show, the gang's circus show includes a clown act, Spanky and Leonard as "a couple of swell acrobats", and lady lion-tamer Darla. When Darla's "lions" break away and everyone scrambles to catch them, Spanky runs into the landlord, to whom he pays the rest of Porky's rent.

The circus show's marquee attraction is "Daredevil Alfalfa" singing "The Daring Young Man on the Flying Trapeze", with Alfalfa's trapeze being held aloft by a pulley system attached to a horse. When a bee turns up and spooks the horse, Alfalfa finds himself pulled and jerked through the air before finally crashing through the ceiling of the barn.

Cast

The Gang
 Darla Hood as Darla
 Eugene Gordon Lee as Porky
 George McFarland as Spanky
 Carl Switzer as Alfalfa
 Billie Thomas as Buckwheat
 Shirley Coates as Muggsy
 Gary Jasgar as Slapsie
 Leonard Landy as Leonard

Additional cast
 Joe Geil as World's Tallest Man / Audience member
 Clarence Wilson as The landlord

Orchestra and audience extras
Jimmy Brown, Hugh Chapman, Freddie Chapman, James Gubitosi, Larry Harris, Payne Johnson, Joe Levine, Gerald Mackey, Gloria Mackey, Harold Switzer,

See also
 Our Gang filmography

References

External links
 
 

1939 films
American black-and-white films
Films directed by George Sidney
Metro-Goldwyn-Mayer short films
1939 comedy films
Our Gang films
1939 short films
1930s American films